KJTR-LP (101.7 FM) is a radio station licensed to Rolla, Missouri, United States.  The station is currently owned by Rolla Chinese Christian Association.

References

External links
 

Asian-American culture in Missouri
JTR-LP
JTR-LP